The Declaration on Fundamental Principles and Rights at Work was adopted in 1998, at the 86th International Labour Conference. It is a statement made by the International Labour Organization "that all Members, even if they have not ratified the Conventions in question, have an obligation arising from the very fact of membership in the Organization to respect, to promote and to realize, in good faith and in accordance with the Constitution, the principles concerning the fundamental rights which are the subject of those Conventions".

Core conventions

There are eight core conventions, which cover collective bargaining, forced labour, child labour and discrimination. They require,

freedom to join a union, bargain collectively and take action
Freedom of Association and Protection of the Right to Organise Convention, 1948, No 87 
Right to Organise and Collective Bargaining Convention, 1951, No 98
abolition of forced labour
Forced Labour Convention, 1930, No 29 
Abolition of Forced Labour Convention, 1957, No 105
abolition of labour by children before the end of compulsory school
Minimum Age Convention, 1973, No 138 
Worst Forms of Child Labour Convention, 1999, No 182
no discrimination at work 
Equal Remuneration Convention, 1951, No 100 
Discrimination (Employment and Occupation) Convention, 1958, No 111

See also
Labour law
UK labour law

External links
Text of the Declaration
ILO Conventions and recommendations

International Labour Organization
Labour law
1998 in law
1998 documents
Human rights instruments
1998 in labor relations